The 2003 Nordea Nordic Light Open was a women's tennis tournament played on outdoor clay courts that was part of the Tier IV  category of the 2003 WTA Tour. It was the second edition of the tournament and took place in Espoo, Finland from 4 August until 10 August 2003. Second-seeded Anna Pistolesi won the singles title and earned $22,000 first-prize money.

Finals

Singles
 Anna Pistolesi defeated  Jelena Kostanić, 6–1, 6–1
 It was Pistolesi's 2nd singles title of the year and the 8th of her career.

Doubles
 Evgenia Kulikovskaya /  Elena Tatarkova defeated  Tatiana Perebiynis /  Silvija Talaja, 6–2, 6–4

References

External links
 ITF tournament edition details
 Tournament draws

Nordea Nordic Light Open
2003
2003 in Finnish sport
August 2003 sports events in Europe